La Voz Kids (Spanish for The Voice Kids) is a Mexican singing competition television series for contestants aged 7 to 15 and is broadcast on Azteca Uno. The show originally premiered May 12, 2017 on Las Estrellas. It is based on The Voice franchise created by television producer John de Mol. The show's rights were acquired by TV Azteca in 2020 for its third season.

Format 

The show consists of three phases: Blind audition, Battle phase, and Performance shows. Three judges/coaches (Four from season three and after), all noteworthy recording artists, choose teams of contestants through a blind audition process (18 members in season 1-2, 15 in season 3 and 21 in season 4).

First Phase – The Blind Auditions 

Each judge has the length of the auditioner's performance (about one minute) to decide if he or she wants that singer on his or her team; if two or more judges want the same singer (as happens frequently), the singer has the final choice of coach. In the Second season, the block button was featured where a coach could prevent another coach from getting a contestant.

Second Phase – The Battles 

In this phase three artists battle against each other directly by singing the same song together, with the coach choosing which artist advances to the Performance Shows. The losing artists are automatically eliminated. In season four, a 'Save' feature was added. This new twist allowed other coaches to push their button, and the first to do so was allowed to walk backstage and welcome one of the two eliminated artists into their team.

Third Phase – The Performance Shows 

In the Performance Shows, each artist competes to receive their coach’s and public’s vote. The artists with the highest votes from their team advance to the next round. This repeats throughout the show until the Finale, where one artist per team is voted as the Top 4. In the Finale, the highest voted artist wins the title as their country’s The Voice 'Kid', along with their coach.

Coaches and hosts
After five successful seasons of La Voz... México, Televisa confirmed they would also produce the kids version with Maluma, Rosario Flores and Emmanuel & Mijares as the coaches. Coach from the adult version, Yuri was host, alongside Olivia Peralta who served backstage. In September 2019, Televisa announced the official airing of the second season labeling it as ¡La ultima y nos vemós! (The last one and we'll see you!). Carlos Rivera and Lucero who both served as coaches in the adult version were confirmed as the coaches, alongside Melendi. Both hosts returned for the second season.

The third season was set to air in early 2020, but due to the COVID-19 pandemic delays, it was pushed to 2021. Filming for the third season began in October 2020 with Belinda, Mau y Ricky, María José, and Camilo being revealed as the coaches. On January 19, 2022, evening show Ventaneando announced former La Voz Ecuador coach Paty Cantú with debutants María León, Joss Favela and returning coach duo Mau y Ricky as part of the fourth season's coaching panel.

Coaches and hosts

Coaches and contestants 

 – Winning Coach/Contestant. Winners are in bold.
 – Runner-Up Coach/Contestant. Final contestant first listed.
Saved contestants from other coaches' teams are italicized.

Series overview
Warning: the following table presents a significant amount of different colors.

Season 1

Season 2

Season 3

Season 4

References

Mexico
2017 Mexican television series debuts
Television series about children
Television series about teenagers
Mexican television series based on non-Mexican television series